Theo Anthony Lewis (born 10 August 1991) is an English footballer who plays as a midfielder for Southern League Division One Central side Cirencester Town.

Club career
Lewis started his career as a youth player at Chelsea and Reading before joining Cheltenham Town for the 2007–08 season. He made his first team debut in a League One match against Scunthorpe United in the 3–0 away defeat on 28 April 2009, replacing Kyle Haynes as a substitute in the 73rd minute.

Having been a squad player for much of 2009–10 and 2010–11 seasons, Lewis found himself out of the first team picture in 2011–12 and went out on loan to rivals Gloucester City on 12 March 2012, originally for a month which was extended to the rest of the season. After the end of Gloucester's season, Lewis returned to Cheltenham and made his only League Two appearance in their final league game against Plymouth Argyle. In May 2012, Lewis was released by Cheltenham after the expiry of his contract.

Following his release from Cheltenham, Theo trialled at Salisbury City. This proved successful as he later signed for the club after impressing manager Darrell Clarke with his footballing ability as well as his enthusiasm and professionalism. He played in the majority of matches during the 2012–13 season as a midfielder. He signed a new deal in the pre-season period ahead of the 2013–14 season, keeping him with Salisbury for another year.

Following financial troubles, Salisbury City were forced to offload a number of their players during the summer and as a result Lewis went on to sign for Woking for the 2014–15 season.

Theo unexpectedly left Woking at the start of the new year once the transfer window opened. He went on to sign for Ebbsfleet United for an undisclosed fee. After failing to make an impression under Ebbsfleet United manager Daryl McMahon, Lewis joined National League South side Havant & Waterlooville on a two-month loan in November 2015. After numerous loan extensions to Lewis's spell with Havant & Waterlooville, his stay was made permanent in July 2016.

On 26 February 2022, Lewis signed for Southern League side Banbury United. 

In July 2022, Lewis joined Southern League Division One Central club Cirencester Town.

Career statistics

References

External links
Theo Lewis profile at ctfc.com

1991 births
Living people
Footballers from Oxford
English footballers
Association football forwards
Cheltenham Town F.C. players
Gloucester City A.F.C. players
Salisbury City F.C. players
Woking F.C. players
Ebbsfleet United F.C. players
Havant & Waterlooville F.C. players
Gosport Borough F.C. players
Banbury United F.C. players
Cirencester Town F.C. players
English Football League players
National League (English football) players
Isthmian League players
Southern Football League players